Baroness Maria Augusta von Trapp DHS (26 January 1905 – 28 March 1987) was the stepmother and matriarch of the Trapp Family Singers. She wrote The Story of the Trapp Family Singers, which was published in 1949 and was the inspiration for the 1956 West German film The Trapp Family, which in turn inspired the 1959 Broadway musical The Sound of Music and its 1965 film version.

Biography

Early life
Maria was born on 26 January 1905 to Augusta (née Rainer) and Karl Kutschera. She was delivered on a train heading from her parents' village in Tyrol to a hospital in Vienna, Austria.

Her mother died of pneumonia when she was two. Her father, grief-stricken, left Maria with his cousin (her foster mother) who had cared for Maria's half-brother after his mother died. Maria's father then traveled the world, although Maria would visit him upon occasion at his apartment in Vienna.  When she was nine, her father died. Her foster mother's son-in-law, Uncle Franz, then became her guardian.

Uncle Franz did not treat Maria well and punished her for things she did not do.  (He later was found to be mentally ill.)  This changed Maria from the shy child she was and, as a teenager, she became the "class cut-up", figuring she may as well have fun if she was going to get in trouble either way. Despite this change, Maria continued to get good grades.

After graduating from high school at 15, Maria ran away to stay with a friend with the intent to become a tutor for children staying at nearby hotels. As she looked so young, no one took her seriously. Finally, a hotel manager asked her to be the umpire for a tennis tournament. Although she did not know what an umpire was and had never played tennis, she took the job.

From this job, she saved enough money to enter the State Teachers College for Progressive Education in Vienna, where she also received a scholarship. She graduated from there at age 18, in 1923.

In 1924, she entered Nonnberg Abbey, a Benedictine monastery in Salzburg, as a postulant intending to become a nun.

Marriage

Maria was asked to teach one of the seven children (Maria Franziska) of widowed naval commander Georg von Trapp in 1926, while she was still a schoolteacher at the abbey. His wife, Agathe Whitehead, had died in 1922 from scarlet fever. Eventually, Maria began to look after the other children (Rupert, Agathe, Werner, Hedwig, Johanna and Martina), as well.

Captain von Trapp saw how much she cared about his children and asked her to marry him, although he was 25 years her senior. She was frightened and fled back to Nonnberg Abbey to seek guidance from the mother abbess, Virgilia Lütz, who advised her that it was God's will that she should marry him. She then returned to the family and accepted his proposal. She wrote in her autobiography that she was very angry on her wedding day, both at God and at her new husband, because what she really wanted was to be a nun. "I really and truly was not in love. I liked him but didn't love him. However, I loved the children, so in a way I really married the children. I learned to love him more than I have ever loved before or after." They were married on 26 November 1927 and had three children together: Rosmarie (1929-2022), Eleonore ("Lorli") (1931-2021) and Johannes (born 1939).

Medical problems 
The Von Trapps enjoyed hiking. On one outing, they stayed  overnight at a farmer's house. The next morning, they were informed that Maria and two of Georg’s daughters, Johanna and Martina, had scarlet fever. Johanna and Martina recovered, but the older Maria developed kidney stones, due to dehydration. Her stepdaughter, Maria, accompanied her to Vienna for a successful surgery, but Maria experienced lifelong kidney problems.

Financial problems 
The family met with financial ruin in 1935. Georg had transferred his savings from a bank in London to an Austrian bank run by a friend named Frau Lammer. Austria was experiencing economic difficulties during a worldwide depression because of the Crash of 1929 and Lammer's bank failed. To survive, the Trapps discharged most of their servants, moved into the top floor of their house, and rented out the other rooms. The Archbishop of Salzburg, Sigismund Waitz, sent Father Franz Wasner to stay with them as their chaplain and this began their singing career.

Early musical career and departure from Austria 
Soprano Lotte Lehmann heard the family sing, and she suggested they perform at concerts. When the Austrian Chancellor Kurt Schuschnigg heard them over the radio, he invited them to perform in Vienna.

After performing at a festival in 1935, they became a popular touring act. They experienced life under the Nazis after the annexation of Austria by Germany in March 1938. Life became increasingly difficult as they witnessed hostility toward Jewish children by their classmates, the use of children against their parents, the advocacy of abortion both by Maria's doctor and by her son's school and finally by the induction of Georg into the German Navy. They visited Munich in the summer of 1938 and encountered Hitler at a restaurant. In September, the family left Austria and traveled to Italy, then to England and finally the United States. The Nazis made use of their abandoned home as Heinrich Himmler's headquarters.

Initially calling themselves the "Trapp Family Choir", the von Trapps began to perform in the United States and Canada. They performed in New York City at The Town Hall on 10 December 1938. The New York Times wrote:

There was something unusually lovable and appealing about the modest, serious singers of this little family aggregation as they formed a close semicircle about their self-effacing director for their initial offering, the handsome Mme. von Trapp in simple black, and the youthful sisters garbed in black and white Austrian folk costumes enlivened with red ribbons. It was only natural to expect work of exceeding refinement from them, and one was not disappointed in this.

Charles Wagner was their first booking agent, then they signed on with Frederick Christian Schang. Thinking the name "Trapp Family Choir" too churchy, Schang Americanized their repertoire and, following his suggestion, the group changed its name to the "Trapp Family Singers". The family, which by then included ten children, was soon touring the world giving concert performances. Alix Williamson served as the group's publicist for over two decades. After the war, they founded the Trapp Family Austrian Relief fund, which sent food and clothing to people impoverished in Austria.

Move to the United States

In the 1940s, the family moved to Stowe, Vermont, where they ran a music camp when they were not touring. In 1944, Maria Augusta, Maria Franziska, Johanna, Martina, Hedwig and Agathe applied for U.S. citizenship, whereas Georg never applied to become a citizen. Rupert and Werner became citizens by serving during World War II, while Rosmarie and Eleonore became citizens by virtue of their mother's citizenship. Johannes was born in the United States in Philadelphia on the 17th January 1939 during a concert tour. Georg von Trapp died in 1947 in Vermont after suffering lung cancer.

The family made a series of 78-rpm records for RCA Victor in the 1950s, some of which were later issued on RCA Camden LPs. There were also a few later recordings released on LPs, including some stereo sessions. In 1957, the Trapp Family Singers disbanded and went their separate ways. Maria and three of her children became missionaries in Papua New Guinea. In 1965, Maria moved back to Vermont to manage the Trapp Family Lodge, which had been named Cor Unum. She began turning over management of the lodge to her son Johannes, although she was initially reluctant to do so. 
Hedwig returned to Austria and worked as a teacher in Umhausen.

Death
Maria von Trapp died of heart failure on 28 March 1987, aged 82, in Morrisville, Vermont, three days following surgery. She is interred in the family cemetery at the lodge, along with her husband and five of her step-children.

Decorations and awards
The family has won the following awards:
 1949 – Benemerenti Medal (Pope Pius XII), in recognition of the benefits of the Trapp Family Austrian Relief for needy Austrians
 1952 – Dame of the Order of the Holy Sepulchre (Vatican-Pope Pius XII)
 1956 – Catholic Mother of the Year in the United States. Women receive this honorary title, to recognise exemplary behavior
 1957 – Decoration of Honour in Gold for Services to the Republic of Austria
 1962 – Siena Medal – an award given by Theta Phi Alpha women's fraternity to "an outstanding woman to recognize her for her endurance and great accomplishment." The medal is the highest honor the organization bestows upon a non-member and is named after Saint Catherine of Siena.
 1967 – Austrian Cross of Honour for Science and Art, 1st class
 2007 – The von Trapp Family received the Egon Ranshofen Wertheimer Prize in Braunau am Inn 
 2012 – Naming of Maria Trapp-Platz in Donaustadt (22nd District of Vienna)

Children

Adaptations of the autobiography

Maria von Trapp's book, The Story of the Trapp Family Singers, published in 1949, was a best-seller. It was made into two successful German / Austrian films:
 The Trapp Family (1956)
 The Trapp Family in America (1958)

The book was then adapted into The Sound of Music, a 1959 Broadway musical by Rodgers and Hammerstein, starring Mary Martin and Theodore Bikel. It was a success, running for more than three years. The musical was adapted in 1965 as a motion picture of the same name, starring Julie Andrews. The film version set US box office records, and Maria von Trapp received about $500,000 ($ today) in royalties.

Maria von Trapp made a cameo appearance in the movie version of The Sound of Music (1965). For an instant, she, her daughter Rosmarie, and Werner's daughter Barbara can be seen walking past an archway during the song, "I Have Confidence", at the line, "I must stop these doubts, all these worries / If I don't, I just know I'll turn back."

Maria von Trapp sang "Edelweiss" with Andrews on The Julie Andrews Hour  in 1973. In 1991, a 40 episode anime series, titled Trapp Family Story aired in Japan, her character referred to by her maiden name (Maria Kutschera), voiced by Masako Katsuki. She was portrayed in the 2015 film The von Trapp Family: A Life of Music by Yvonne Catterfeld.

Writings
 The Story of the Trapp Family Singers (1949)
 Around the Year with the Trapp Family (1955)
 A Family on Wheels: Further Adventures of the Trapp Family Singers (c. 1959)
 Yesterday, Today and Forever: The Religious Life of a Remarkable Family (1952)
 Maria (1972)
 When the King was Carpenter, Harrison, AR: New Leaf (1976)

References

External links

 History of the von Trapp Family (from the Trapp Family Lodge website)
 Site regarding the von Trapp descendants
 Maria von Trapp interview on BBC Radio 4 Desert Island Discs, 29 December 1983

1905 births
1987 deaths
Musicians from Vienna
20th-century Austrian women singers
Austrian emigrants to the United States
Austrian baronesses
Austrian Roman Catholics
Austrian anti-fascists
Musical theatre characters
Emigrants from Austria after the Anschluss
People from Stowe, Vermont
Maria
Austrian governesses
Recipients of the Benemerenti medal
Recipients of the Decoration of Honour for Services to the Republic of Austria
Recipients of the Austrian Cross of Honour for Science and Art, 1st class
Burials in Vermont
Musicians from Vermont
Women autobiographers
Austrian autobiographers